The TransAmerican Power Products CRV Open was a men's professional golf tournament held in Mexico on PGA Tour Latinoamérica. The tournament was first played in 2012 at La Herradura Golf Club and the inaugural winner of the event was Ariel Cañete.

The tournament was never held at the same venue twice, having been played at the Atlas Country Club in 2013 when Manuel Villegas was victorious, before moving to Las Lomas Club de Golf in 2014 when Marcelo Rozo emerged as the winner after a rare seven-man playoff, something which has never happened on the PGA Tour.

Winners

References

PGA Tour Latinoamérica events
Golf tournaments in Mexico
Recurring sporting events established in 2012
Recurring sporting events disestablished in 2014
2012 establishments in Mexico
2014 disestablishments in Mexico
Defunct sports competitions in Mexico
Zapopan